Anna Alexandrovna Barkova, July 16, 1901 – April 29, 1976, was a Soviet poet, journalist, playwright, essayist, memoirist, and writer of fiction. She was imprisoned for more than 20 years in the Gulag. In 2017 a film about her life was released by Ceská , titled 8 hlav sílenství (also known as 8 Heads of Madness), starring the popular singer Aneta Langerová; it's mainly about her life in the camps and the women she loved.

Early life
Anna Alexandrovna Barkova was born into the family of a private school janitor in the textile town of Ivanovo in 1901. She was allowed to attend the school because of her father's position, a rare opportunity for a young working class girl in pre-revolutionary Russia.

In 1918, she enrolled as a member of the Circle of Genuine Proletarian Poets, a writers group based in Ivanovo. Soon after joining she began to write short pieces for the group's paper The Land of the Workers. She also published poetry in the paper under the pseudonym Kalika perekhozhaia ("the wandering cripple"), a name given to blind or maimed singers who went from village to village singing devotional ballads to obtain alms.

Literary work
Barkova's early poetry attracted the attention of the Bolshevik literary establishment, including the leading critic Aleksandr Voronsky and the Commisar of Enlightenment Anatoly Lunacharsky. Lunacharsky became her patron, and in 1922 she moved to Moscow to act as his secretary. Also in 1922, her first poetry collection Woman was published with a foreword by Lunacharsky. In 1923 her play Nastasya Bonfire was published.

She also attended the writer's school in Moscow directed by Valery Bryusov, and wrote for his paper Print and Revolution. Later, Maria Ulyanova, the sister of Vladimir Lenin, found Anna a position at the paper Pravda, and helped her to put together a second collection of poems that was never published.

Imprisonment and exile
Barkova became increasingly disillusioned with Soviet life in the late 1920s. Her poems of the early 1930s were highly critical of Soviet life and institutions. She wrote in 1925:

In 1934, Barkova was denounced and arrested, and some of her poetry was used against her as evidence. She was sentenced to five years imprisonment. She endured a repeat arrest in November 1947, when she was sentenced to 10 years imprisonment and five years of restricted rights. Her second conviction was overturned in December 1955 and she was freed. She was rehabilitated in October 1957, then arrested for a third time in November, and sentenced again to 10 years in prison and five years of restricted rights. She was finally freed when this third conviction was overturned in May 1965. She also suffered two periods of exile from 1940 to 1947 (spent in Kaluga) and from 1965 to 1967. In 1967, she was allowed to return to Moscow after the intervention of a group of writers led by Alexander Tvardovsky and Konstantin Fedin. She lived out the remainder of her life in relative poverty in a communal flat in the Garden Ring, where she preserved her enthusiasm for books, friends, and conversation.

English translations
 A Few Autobiographical Facts and Tatar Anguish, (poems), from ''An Anthology of Russian Women's Writing, 1777–1992, Oxford, 1994.

References

External links
Site dedicated to her (Russian) at bard.ru

1901 births
1976 deaths
People from Ivanovo
People from Shuysky Uyezd
Russian prisoners and detainees
Soviet dramatists and playwrights
Soviet short story writers
20th-century Russian short story writers
Soviet poets
Soviet women writers
Soviet dissidents
Gulag detainees
Soviet prisoners and detainees
Soviet non-fiction writers
Pseudonymous women writers
Russian women short story writers
Russian women poets
Russian women journalists
Women dramatists and playwrights
20th-century Russian women writers
20th-century non-fiction writers
20th-century pseudonymous writers
Soviet women poets